Servaas "Faas" Wilkes (13 October 1923 – 15 August 2006) was a Dutch football forward, who earned a total of 38 caps for the Dutch national team, in which he scored 35 goals (average 0.92 goals per game). However, for a prolonged period of his career, June 1949 through till March 1955, he was banned from the national team since the KNVB did not allow professional players to participate. He also played for the Netherlands at the 1948 Summer Olympics.

Career
Wilkes played for Xerxes Rotterdam, before moving to Internazionale in the summer of 1949. There he played 95 matches, scoring 47 goals. After his stay in Milan ended in 1952, he had a one-season spell at Torino. At age 30 he moved to Valencia in Spain, scoring a total of 38 goals in 62 appearances between 1953–54 and 1955–56, making him the first foreign idol of the club. He also played for VVV, Levante, and Fortuna '54. He died of a cardiac arrest in 2006, aged 82.
 
He is considered one of the best footballers the Netherlands ever produced, being especially known for his creative style of play and brilliant dribbling. Wilkes was the 4th Dutch player (after Gerrit Keizer, Bep Bakhuys and Gerrit Vreken) who moved to play abroad.

The Dutch cartoon character Kick Wilstra was named in part after Faas Wilkes (Wilstra was also named after two other Dutch footballers, Kick Smit and Abe Lenstra).

Career statistics

Player

Honours 
 Internazionale
 Serie A runner-up: 1950–51
 Serie A third place: 1949–50, 1951–52

 Valencia
 La Liga Third Place: 1953–54
 Concepción Arenal Trophy: 1954

 Levante
 Segunda División Runner-up: 1958–59
Individual
 Netherlands All-Time Top Scorer: 1959–1998
 Spanish Player of the Year: 1954
 Internazionale Top Scorer: 1950–51
 Valencia Top Scorer: 1953–54, 1955–56
 Levante Top Scorer: 1958–59

References

External links

 Faas Wilkes at Voetbal International 
 
 
 In memorial for Faas Wilkes  (Dutch)

1923 births
2006 deaths
Dutch footballers
Netherlands international footballers
Association football forwards
Dutch expatriate footballers
Dutch expatriate sportspeople in Spain
Dutch expatriate sportspeople in Italy
Expatriate footballers in Spain
Expatriate footballers in Italy
Eredivisie players
Serie A players
XerxesDZB players
Inter Milan players
Torino F.C. players
La Liga players
Valencia CF players
VVV-Venlo players
Levante UD footballers
Fortuna Sittard players
Footballers at the 1948 Summer Olympics
Olympic footballers of the Netherlands
Footballers from Rotterdam